Sital Devi (Nepali: सीतल देवी)  is a residential area located in ward number 12 in Pokhara Metropolitan City in Nepal. Sital Devi temple is located near this place.

References 

Neighbourhoods in Pokhara
Kaski District
Gandaki Province